Askania-Nova  is a Ukrainian nature reserve located in Kherson Oblast, Ukraine, within the dry Taurida steppe near Oleshky Sands and active member of the UNESCO Man and the Biosphere Programme. It is also a research institute of the Ukrainian Academy of Agricultural Sciences. The reserve consists of a zoological park, a botanical (dendrological) garden, and an open territory of virgin steppes.

History 

The nature reserve was established in 1898 by Friedrich-Jacob Eduardovych Falz-Fein (1863–1920) around the German colony of Askania-Nova, which only in 1890 became an organized settlement, Khutir.

In March 1919, Askania-Nova was confiscated from the Falz-Fein family by the Red Army as part of the state nationalization programme. The last owner refused to evacuate to Germany. She was Sofia-Louise Bohdanivna (Gottlieb) Knauff (1835–1919), the mother of Friedrich Falz-Fein. Her refusal resulted in her summary execution by two Red Army guardsmen who shot her for failing to surrender her estate in Khorly (today a port in Kherson Oblast). On April 1, 1919, Askania-Nova was declared a People's Sanctuary Park by a decree of the Council of People's Commissars of the Ukrainian SSR; while on February 8, 1921, it was reorganized into a State Steppe Reserve of the Ukrainian SSR. The main purposes of the reserve was to preserve and study the environment of the virgin steppe as well as possibly to acclimatize and study a larger number of animal and plant types.

Askania-Nova became a scientific-steppe station, a zoo-technical station with breeding farms, a phyto-technical station, and included various other scientific institutions. Notably, the zoo and botanical garden were greatly expanded. Part of the reserve included portions of steppe reserve, an acclimatization zoo, and an arboretum. From 1932 to 1956, the reserve was transformed into the All-Union scientific-research institute for the hybridization and acclimatization of animals of M. Ivanov. It consisted of 12 departments (including the botanical garden, steppe reserve steppe, and zoo), nine laboratories, conducting experimental farming, and four breeding centres for agricultural animals. The institute became the centre of scientific-researching works in the field of breed creation and the major hub for breeding farms. During both World War I and World War II, the reserve was devastated.

In 1983, Askania-Nova was reorganized into a biosphere reserve and the following year it was designated as the Soviet member of the World Network of Biosphere Reserves of UNESCO. After the fall of the Soviet Union, in 1993, Ukraine confirmed the status of the biosphere reserve Askania-Nova. In 2008, Askania was named one of Seven Wonders of Ukraine.

The biosphere reserve 

The reserve consists of the acclimatization zoo, arboretum (2.1 km², or 518.9 acre), and virgin steppe sanctuary (110 km², or 42.5 sq mi), the last such area in Europe) and has total area of 825 km² (318.5 sq mi). The Askania-Nova wetland Great Chapli Depression is registered on the International list of Ramsar Convention and has an area of 4x6 km. Part of the sanctuary include a small town and six villages with total population of 10,000 people (1997). There is no direct railroad station in the area, and the sanctuary can be reached by bus.

Flora and fauna
More than 200 species of foliaceous and coniferous plants were brought from different parts of the world and planted in the dendrologic garden during 1885 – 1902. About 600 higher plants (both perennial and annual), 16 species of which were entered to the Red Data Book of Ukraine, have been preserved in their primary natural form.

The reserve also hosts ostriches, bison, antelopes, wild horses, llamas, zebras and many bird species. It is known for a herd of Przewalski's horses, the largest group kept in captivity, living on an area around 30 km² (11.5 sq mi). The Turkmenian kulan (Equus hemionus kulan) has been reintroduced.

The biosphere reserve has been designated an Important Bird Area (IBA) by BirdLife International because it supports populations of red-breasted and greater white-fronted geese, ruddy shelducks, demoiselle and common cranes, black-winged pratincoles, and pallid harriers.

Climate

Access
The sanctuary is located in a relatively remote area. Its territory completely overlaps the Askania Nova municipality which beside its main town includes five small rural settlements: Illinka (569), Komysh (313), Molochne (762), Novyi Etap (72), Pytomnyk (859); and a separate rural municipality of Markeyevo (783) consisting a former village of the same name. Towards the sanctuary and the town of Askania-Nova leads a "spur" of the regional route  which branches out from the main route near the village of Chkalove (Novotroitske Raion).

In popular culture

 The Winter Horses by Philip Kerr - a historical fiction novel about two people at Askaniya-Nova in Ukraine attempting to save Przewalski's horses from the dinner tables of Nazi soldiers during World War II.

See also
 Ramsar Classification System for Wetland Type

References

External links

 Askania Nova in Ukraine - interesting facts and photos
 Friedrich von Falz-Fein – Genealogical pages on the Falz-Fein family tracing the history of Askania-Nova back to Johann Fein, in English
 Webpage in Russian
 Page of Ascania-Nova on the 7wonders of Ukraine website – in Ukrainian

Geography of Kherson Oblast
Biosphere reserves of Ukraine
History of Anhalt
Parks in Ukraine
Wetlands of Ukraine
Botanical gardens in Ukraine
Zoos in Ukraine
Protected areas of Ukraine
Buildings and structures in Kherson Oblast
Tourist attractions in Kherson Oblast
Institutes of the National Academy of Agrarian Sciences of Ukraine
Biological research institutes
Important Bird Areas of Ukraine
Ramsar sites in Ukraine
Kakhovka Raion